The 1905 Connecticut Aggies football team represented Connecticut Agricultural College, now the University of Connecticut, in the 1905 college football season.  This was the tenth year that the school fielded a football team.  The Aggies were led by fourth year head coach Edwin O. Smith, and completed the season with a record of 2–2.

Schedule

References

Connecticut
UConn Huskies football seasons
Connecticut Aggies football